The Soft Machine (also titled Volume One as a reissue) is the debut album by the British psychedelic rock band Soft Machine, released in 1968. It is the group's only album to feature Kevin Ayers as a member.

Overview
Founded in 1966, Soft Machine (one of the central bands in the Canterbury scene) recorded and released this studio album during their 1968 tour of the USA. It was produced by Chas Chandler and Tom Wilson.

The work on this album was one of the essential roots in progressive rock and jazz-fusion.

Track listing

The 2009 Remastered Edition includes "Love Makes Sweet Music" and "Feelin' Reelin' Squeelin'" (bonus tracks), which were-respectively-Side A and Side B of their first single, issued in 1967.

Personnel
 Soft Machine
Mike Ratledge – organ
Kevin Ayers – lead guitar, bass, lead vocals (on 10), spoken word (on 12)
Robert Wyatt – drums, lead vocals
Additional personnel
Hugh Hopper – fuzz bass (on 13)
The Cake – backing vocals (on 12)

Charts

References

External links 
 The Soft Machine - The Soft Machine (1968) album review by John Bush, credits & releases at AllMusic
 The Soft Machine - The Soft Machine (1968) album releases & credits at Discogs
 The Soft Machine - The Soft Machine (1968) album to be listened on Spotify
 The Soft Machine - The Soft Machine (1968) album to be listened on YouTube

Soft Machine albums
1968 debut albums
Albums produced by Tom Wilson (record producer)
Albums recorded at Record Plant (New York City)
Barclay (record label) albums
Probe Records albums
Albums produced by Chas Chandler
Psychedelic rock albums by English artists